The National Sanctuary of our Sorrowful Mother, popularly known as The Grotto, is a Catholic outdoor shrine and sanctuary located in the Madison South district of Portland, Oregon, United States. It is a ministry of the Servite Friars, Order of Friar Servants of Mary.
A large meditation hall whose main chamber is at clifftop level extends down to the foot of the cliff; the cross on the hill is visible many miles away. In addition to a church, there are several thousand feet of trails, including a trail of the Stations of the Cross, along which visitors may pass in contemplation through botanical gardens. The Grotto also features a full-service Conference Center, and a Gift Shop.

History
The Grotto was established in 1924 by Friar Ambrose Mayer, a native of Ontario, Canada, who was sent to the United States where he was a Servite pastor for the Archdiocese of Portland, Oregon. Upon moving to Portland, Mayer found acreage located outside Northeast Portland that was at the time owned by the Union Pacific Railroad Company, and had been put up for sale to be developed into residential property. Mayer made a downpayment of $3,000 and purchased the property in 1923.A national campaign raised the balance of the funds needed to pay for the land.  

Mayer envisioned The Grotto as a natural cathedral, and construction began in September 1923. A cave was carved out of the 110-foot basalt cliff, and a statue of Mary holding Jesus's crucified body was installed. Several years later, a marble recreation of Michelangelo's Pietà was also installed. Three thousand people gathered for the first mass at the Grotto on May 29, 1924.

In 1955, the Chapel of Mary was dedicated on the grounds, and in 1983 the Grotto was designated as a National Sanctuary. The grounds of the Grotto include 62 acres of pathways, forest, and an upper-level botanical garden situated above the cliff, which are accessed through an elevator built against the cliff wall. The upper botanical gardens also provide expansive views of the Columbia River Valley, the Cascade Mountains, and Mount St. Helens.

Vandalism
On November 30, 2012, unknown vandals broke into the grounds and vandalized multiple statues. Statues depicting St. Joseph and baby Jesus were beheaded, and a statue of the Virgin Mary was toppled over and also had its head removed. All of the statues were made of centuries-old Carrara marble. Two angel statues were also damaged. The statues have since been replaced or restored.

Features

Plaza Level
 Chapel of Mary
 The Grotto
 Stations of the Cross
 statues
 Gift Shop
 Conference Center

 Upper Level Gardens
 Meditation Chapel
 shrines
 Lithuanian Wayside Shrine
 Our Lady of Częstochowa Polish Shrine
 Dambana, Filipino Faith Shrine 
 Our Lady of Guadalupe Shrine
 Our Lady of La Vang Shrine
 Peace Garden
 Mysteries of the Rosary
 Monastery
 Rose Garden
 St. Anne's Chapel
 Via Matris

Sculptures
The Smithsonian Institution has 23 statues and memorials registered at The Grotto:

 Glorious Mysteries
 John Fitzgerald Kennedy Memorial
 Joyful Mysteries
 Kneeling Angels
 Lithuanian Wayside Shrine
 Marilyn Moyer Meditation Chapel Fountain
 Our Lady of Lourdes
 Peace Pole
 Pietà with Two Angels
 Sacred Heart
 Sacred Heart Shrine
 Saints in Niches
 Sorrowful Mysteries
 Sorrows and Joys of St. Joseph
 St. Joseph
 St. Jude Shrine
 St. Philip Benizi
 Stations of the Cross
 Statue of Mary
 The Assumption of Our Blessed Mother
 The Calvary Statue
 The Christus
 Via Matris

Events 
There are various events at The Grotto throughout the year, as well as meetings and seminars. Every December The Grotto puts up a huge light display along its trails. The first annual "Festival of Lights" first took place in 1988 and lasted for ten nights. It has since been expanded in scope and duration, and the 2015 festival ran for 33 days.  Besides the light displays, there are nightly concerts, caroling, and other family-oriented entertainment. More than 60,000 people attended the Festival each year.

Monastery
The Grotto's 1936 monastery houses friars of the Servite Order.

References

External links

The Grotto (official website)

Cliffs of the United States
Culture of Portland, Oregon
Madison South, Portland, Oregon
Landmarks in Oregon
Roman Catholic Archdiocese of Portland in Oregon
Roman Catholic national shrines
Roman Catholic national shrines in the United States
Roman Catholic shrines